The women's heptathlon event at the 1986 Commonwealth Games was held on 26 and 27 July at the Meadowbank Stadium in Edinburgh.

Results

References

Day 1 results
Day 2 results
Day 2 results

Athletics at the 1986 Commonwealth Games
1986